David Ayomide Kasumu (born 5 October 1999) is an English professional footballer who plays as a midfielder for EFL Championship club Huddersfield Town.

Club career

Milton Keynes Dons
Kasumu joined Milton Keynes Dons' academy in 2013, and went on to progress through various age groups before moving into the club's development squad. On 30 April 2016, he was named as a substitute for the first team's away trip to Ipswich Town but did not feature.

On 9 August 2016, Kasumu made his full professional debut for the club, playing 62 minutes in a 2–3 EFL Cup first round away win over Newport County. On 26 December 2017, he signed professional terms, a one-and-a-half year deal which was later extended a further year. On 13 August 2019, Kasumu scored his first goal for the club in a 2–2 EFL Cup first round encounter with rivals AFC Wimbledon. He signed a new contract in December 2019, with undisclosed terms. Towards the end of the 2021–22 season Kasumu was offered another contract extension but decided to leave the club upon the expiry of his existing deal to pursue a move elsewhere.

Huddersfield Town
On 6 July 2022, Kasumu signed for EFL Championship club Huddersfield Town on a three-year deal until 2025, with an undisclosed amount of compensation paid to Milton Keynes Dons due to his age.

International career
In July 2015, Kasumu was called up to the Nigeria U15 national team and took part in a training camp in Abuja.

Career statistics

Honours
Individual
Milton Keynes Dons Academy Player of the Year: 2017–18

References

External links

Living people
1999 births
Footballers from Lambeth
English footballers
English people of Nigerian descent
Association football midfielders
Milton Keynes Dons F.C. players
Huddersfield Town A.F.C. players
English Football League players
Black British sportsmen